This is a list of the members of the 1934 Seanad Éireann, the upper house of the Oireachtas (legislature) of the Irish Free State. These Senators were elected at the 1925, 1928, 1931 and 1934 Seanad elections.

Composition of the 1934 Seanad
The Free State Seanad was elected in stages and thus considered to be in permanent session. However, as a gesture of continuity with its Free State predecessor, the first Seanad elected after 1937 is numbered as the "Second Seanad". The Free State Senate, despite the occurrence of five senatorial elections before its abolition, is considered to have been a single 'Seanad' for the duration of its existence and is thus referred for that whole period as the "First Seanad".

There were a total of 60 seats in the Free State Seanad. In 1934, 22 Senators were elected. The Seanad election in 1925 was a popular election. However, at the 1928 and subsequent Free State Seanad elections, the franchise was restricted to Oireachtas members.

23 Senators had been elected at the 1931 Seanad election, 17 Senators had been elected at the 1928 Seanad election and 19 Senators had been elected at the 1925 Seanad election. This was the final election of the Free State Seanad before it was abolished on 29 May 1936.

The following table shows the composition by party when the 1934 Seanad first met on 12 December 1934.

Election of Cathaoirleach
At the first meeting on the 12 December 1934 there was a contest to decide who would be elected Cathaoirleach (chairman). James J. MacKean was absent for the vote but all other members were present. General Sir William Hickie chaired the election. The two candidates were the outgoing Cathaoirleach, Thomas Westropp Bennett, and the Fianna Fáil candidate, Michael Comyn. Neither of the two candidates voted and so fifty-six senators voted in the election. This resulted in a tie of twenty-eight votes each. Westropp Bennett received the votes of all twenty-one members of Fine Gael and seven independents. Comyn received the votes of his eighteen Fianna Fáil colleagues, all the votes of the seven Labour Party senators and the votes of three independents: Sir Edward Bellingham, Thomas Linehan and Laurence O'Neill. Hickie then gave his casting vote for Westropp Bennett saying he would have done so had he had the opportunity in the division.

The following week, Comyn defeated the outgoing Leas-Chathaoirleach, Michael O'Hanlon of Fine Gael, by twenty-six votes to twenty-five.

List of senators

Changes

See also
Modern Seanad Éireann
Members of the 8th Dáil
Government of the 8th Dáil

References

External links

 
 1934